Daan Rienstra (born 6 October 1992) is a Dutch professional footballer who plays as a midfielder for Greek Super League club PAS Giannina. Besides the Netherlands, he has played in Greece.

Career

PAS Giannina
On 12 July 2022 he moved to PAS Giannina the main club in the city of Ioannina in Greece.

Personal life
His brother is professional football player Ben Rienstra.

Career statistics

References

External links
 

1992 births
Living people
Dutch footballers
Heracles Almelo players
RKC Waalwijk players
Volos N.F.C. players
PAS Giannina F.C. players
Eredivisie players
Eerste Divisie players
Super League Greece players
Dutch expatriate footballers
Dutch expatriate sportspeople in Greece
Expatriate footballers in Greece
Sportspeople from Alkmaar
Association football midfielders
Footballers from North Holland